Cordula may mean:

 Cordula (name)
 Saint Cordula, virgin martyr
 Cordula. Graubündner Sage, an epic poem by Max Waldau, of 1854
 Cordula, a slipper orchid genus nowadays synonymous with Paphiopedilum
 Cordula (film), 1950 film
 Cordula, typical Sardinian dish
Sint Cordula Instituut